The 1978 Minnesota gubernatorial election took place on November 7, 1978. Independent-Republican Party candidate Al Quie defeated Minnesota Democratic–Farmer–Labor Party incumbent Rudy Perpich. Robert W. Johnson unsuccessfully ran for the Republican nomination.

Democratic primary 
The Democratic primary had two major candidates.

Rudy Perpich, incumbent governor, 80.04%. 

Alice Tripp, farmers activist, 19.96%.

Results

References

External links
 http://www.sos.state.mn.us/home/index.asp?page=653
 http://www.sos.state.mn.us/home/index.asp?page=657

Minnesota
Gubernatorial
1978
November 1978 events in the United States